This is a list of ponds (fish ponds) in the Czech Republic, greater than 150 ha, sorted by area.

See also

List of dams and reservoirs in the Czech Republic
List of lakes of the Czech Republic
List of rivers of the Czech Republic

References

Ponds